The Loxurini are a small tribe of butterflies in the family Lycaenidae.

Genera
As not all Theclinae have been assigned to tribes, the genus list is preliminary. Dapidodigma, sometimes placed here, rather seems to belong to the Cheritrini, however.

 Drina
 Eooxylides
 Loxura
 Neomyrina
 Thamala
 Yasoda

 
Taxa named by John Nevill Eliot
Butterfly tribes